Valladolid, officially the Municipality of Valladolid,  is a 4th class municipality in the province of Negros Occidental, Philippines. According to the 2020 census, it has a population of 39,996 people.

Known as the "Fruit Basket of Negros Occidental," the municipality celebrates its fiesta every 28 February.

History 
The place was first called “Inabuyan” until the Spanish leaders arrived and one of them named the place after his native town Valladolid in Spain.  During the Spanish era, Valladolid was considered one of the most prosperous towns of Negros Occidental. The size of the convent and church built by the Recollect Missionaries in 1851 were proofs of this status considering that the church authorities were powerful in running the affairs of the government.

Valladolid was established in 1860. The influx of settlers from the neighboring islands of Guimaras, Panay and Cebu prompted the then Governor Saravia to create an additional town which is now Pulupandan. The settlers made this town a landing area in coming to Negros, brought about by the introduction of sugar which resulted in the economic growth and prosperity of the island. The town is known as the Rice Granary of Negros Occidental with 90 percent of its arable land planted to palay. It produce more than half a million cavans of rice every year. It also produces vegetables, fruits and the diwal or angel wings shell, a seasonal delicacy.

The Aetas were the original inhabitants of Valladolid. They were ultimately forced to move to the uplands when the early settlers and colonizers came to stay. Significant events in the province during the early founding years as well as major upheavals during and after the revolutionary period brought profound changes in the municipality.

By and large, Valladolid has its place in the historical set-up of the province of Negros Occidental socially, spiritually, economically and politically. It is also the bulwark of Filipinistas Aglipayan in Negros. This dominant sect caused the defeat of the fiery Manuel L. Quezon in the hands of the Aglipayans in the presidential election of 1935 during the Commonwealth era.

Pasundayag Festival is a thanksgiving and celebration of good harvest. It is a farmers festival in honor of the town's patroness, Nuestra Señora de Guadalupe featuring street dancing competition, arena festival dance showdown and merry making.

In 1957, Sitio Paloma was converted into a barrio.

Geography 

Valladolid is located on the south-western coast of the Province of Negros Occidental.

Valladolid is bounded on the north by the town of Pulupandan, on the south by the municipality of San Enrique, on the west by the Guimaras Strait, and on the east by the city of La Carlota. The global location of Municipality of Valladolid is 10 degrees, 27 minutes 54 seconds - north and 122 degrees 49 minutes 33.6 seconds - east with Our Lady of Guadalupe Church as the benchmark.

Valladolid has two pronounced seasons, wet and dry. The rainy season starts from May to January of the following year with heavy rains occurring during the months of August and September. Dry season starts from the month of February until the last week of April.

Barangays 
Valladolid is geographically subdivided into 16 barangays.

Climate

Demographics

Religion 
Philippine Independent Church- Majority of the population of the town are followers of the Aglipayan faith.
 Roman Catholic Church

Economy

Major industries
 Hog raising
 Furniture
 Fishery
 Poultry
 Rice production
 Sugar production

Major products
 Hablon (garments)
 Angel Wing Clams
 Mango from Guimaras

Education

Primary Level

Public
 Alijis Elementary school
 Ayungon Elementary School
 Batuan Elementary School
 Emilio Infante Elementary School
 Ma. Palacios Presbitero Elementary School
 Pacol Elementary School
 Tabao Elementary School
 Valladolid Elementary School

Private
 Bethel Baptist Church Kindergarten School
 Faith Christian School
 Our Lady of Guadalupe Kinder School
 Negros New Life In Jesus Christian Academy

Secondary Level
 Francisco Infante Memorial High School
 Tabao National high School
 Tabao National High School Lacaron Extension
 Valladolid National High School
 Valladolid National High School Ayungon Extension

Infrastructure

Power
Power supply provided by NOCECO with frequent and unpredictable brownouts.

Water supply
Clean and safe water supply provided by Valladolid Water District.

Tourism
Our Lady of Guadalupe Church: Our Lady of Guadalupe Church was founded in 1851 by the Recollect Missionaries and reputed to be the biggest in the province. The size of the church and convent is a living proof that Valladolid stood among the island's most progressive pueblos during the Spanish era.
Balay Dolid (Valladolid Community Museum): Balay Dolid (Valladolid Community Museum) is one of the ancestral houses in town owned by the Ykalina family. The Valladolid Community Museum features the rich cultural heritage of the town.
Sunset Boulevard: It is a perfect place to watch the beautiful sunset along the Guimaras Strait. A good venue to commune with nature as the water laps along the seawall.
Century-old Acacia Haven: 32 Acacia trees surround the public plaza and provide shade to all passers. It was planted by Ykalina, the first town official.
Relic of an 18th Century Graveyard: This resting place was solely intended for the Ilustrados or the rich member of the community during that time. The area is about 3 hectares surrounded by coral reef stones giving the place a classic effect.
Fruit Stand by the Highway: Situated at the highway of Barangay Poblacion, Purok Ilang-ilang, travelers pass by this area displaying mangoes, watermelon, fruit jams and other exotic delicacies.
Highway Food Park: Located along the highway between Barangay Palaka and Crossing Pacol, this food park is composed of stalls serving breakfast, lunch and dinner. Menu varies from meat, vegetables to fresh seafood.
Tabao Fish Terminal Food Court: Tabao Fish Terminal Food Court at Barangay Central Tabao Fish Terminal opens at 11:00 p.m. to 5:00 a.m. Offers grilled fish, tinola and kinilaw. Also serves coffee with native “Ibus or Suman”.
Tabao Weavers Association (TWA) Display Center: At Barangay Central Tabao offers hand woven products ideal for souvenir.

References

External links 
 [ Philippine Standard Geographic Code]
 Philippine Census Information
 Local Governance Performance Management System

Municipalities of Negros Occidental